Redwood Meadows Golf & Country Club is a semi-private golf club located in the Townsite of Redwood Meadows on the Tsuu T'ina First Nation,  west of Calgary, Alberta, Canada. The golf course was the host of the Nationwide Tour's Alberta Classic in 2004 and 2005.

External links 
Redwood Meadows Golf & Country Club

Golf clubs and courses in Alberta